Veliki Rit is a small geographical area near Begej river in central-eastern Banat, Serbia.

Geographical regions of Serbia
Geography of Vojvodina
Banat